Union Sportive O'Mbila Nziami Libreville is a Gabonese football club based in Libreville, Gabon.

Achievements

Gabon Championnat National D1: 4
 1980, 1981, 1988, 2002

Coupe du Gabon Interclubs: 4
 1987, 1991, 2002, 2008

Performance in CAF competitions
CAF Champions League: 1 appearance
2003 – First Round

 African Cup of Champions Clubs: 2 appearances
1981 – Quarter-finals
1982 – Second Round

CAF Confederation Cup: 2 appearances
2004 – First Round
2009 – First Round

CAF Cup Winners' Cup: 4 appearances
1980 – Second Round
1987 – Second Round
1988 – First Round
1992 – Quarter-finals

Current Squad 2008–09

External links
Team Squad

Football clubs in Gabon
USM Libreville